The 2nd Writers Guild of America Awards honored the best film writers of 1949. Winners were announced in 1950.

Winners & Nominees

Film 
Winners are listed first highlighted in boldface.

References

External links 
 WGA.org

1949
W
1949 in American cinema